María Gloria Contreras Roeniger, better known as Gloria Contreras (November 15, 1934 – November 25, 2015) was a Mexican dancer and choreographer.

Biography 
Contreras was born in Mexico City. She studied dancing under Nelsy Dambré in Mexico from 1946 to 1954, and, after joining the Royal Winnipeg Ballet, visited the School of American Ballet in New York from 1956 to 1964, where she was taught by Pierre Vladimirov, Felia Doubrovska, Anatole Oboukhoff, Muriel Stuart and George Balanchine. From 1958 to 1965 she was also taught by Carola Trier.

Contreras taught choreography at the Universidad Nacional Autónoma de México (UNAM) and was director of its choreography workshop, which she founded in 1970.  Following Balanchine, she had a neo-classical choreographic style and utilized the music of Mexican composers in her work.  Contreras had been a member of the International Dance Council since 2003 and was a member of the Academia de Artes. She was multiply awarded, including Mexico's Premio Nacional de las Artes.

References

External links 
 
 Photo

1934 births
2015 deaths
Mexican female dancers
Mexican ballerinas
Mexican choreographers
Ballet choreographers
Academic staff of the National Autonomous University of Mexico
Musicians from Mexico City